Lazar Petković (born 17 April 1995) is a Serbian footballer who plays as a goalkeeper.

Club career
Petković was first trained at Vojvodina, and passed through the youth academy of Milan in 2011. Petković made his professional for Carpi in a Serie B tie against Perugia on 26 March 2017.

References

External links
 
 

1995 births
Living people
Footballers from Novi Sad
Serbian footballers
A.C. Carpi players
Calcio Padova players
Serie B players
Serie C players
Serie D players
Serbian expatriate footballers
Serbian expatriate sportspeople in Italy
Expatriate footballers in Italy
Association football goalkeepers